Senator Hutchins may refer to:

Bill Hutchins (born 1931), Iowa State Senate
James H. Hutchins, New York State Senate